Loisin is a commune in the Haute-Savoie department in the Auvergne-Rhône-Alpes region in south-eastern France. It has approximately 1500 inhabitants.

Monuments and places
 Saint-Affre Church

Politics and administration

Administrative situation
In 1860 after the annexation from the Savoy, Loisin became part of the canton of Douvaine. Since 2015, it belongs to the canton of Sciez after the cantonal redistribution law from 2014. The commune is part of the communauté d'agglomération Thonon Agglomération.

Sustainable development policy
In 2008, the commune engaged a Sustainable Development policy with the creation of an agenda 21.

Notable people
 Maurice Dunand(1898-1987), archeologist.

See also
Communes of the Haute-Savoie department

References

Communes of Haute-Savoie